The Men's Doubles event at the 2010 South American Games was held over March 21–24.

Medalists

Draw

References
Draw

Men's Doubles